Scott Wright may refer to:

 Scott Wright (actor) (born 1974), British actor
 Mr. Scott Wright, American professional wrestler
 Scott Wright (footballer) (born 1997), Scottish football player
 Scott Olin Wright (born 1923), United States federal judge
 Scott Wright, better known as Micromax, fictional mutant superhero of the Marvel universe